Danielle Christmas (born 21 December 1987) is a British former racing cyclist and middle-distance runner, who last rode for UCI Women's Continental Team .

Athletics career
Prior to cycling, she was a middle-distance runner. She signed up with Crawley Athletic Club and began competing for them at age 12. In 2002 she placed in the top five of the 800 metres at the AAA under-15 meet and the English Schools' Athletics Championships. She improved to third in the 1500 metres at the 2003 English Schools Championships. She established herself among the best young athletes in the country in 2004, winning the English under-17 title over 800 m and placing second in the AAA Junior Championships 1500 m.

Christmas' first international success came at the 2004 Commonwealth Youth Games, where she took 800 m gold. A runner-up finish at the 2006 AAA Junior Championships led to an appearance at the 2006 World Junior Championships in Athletics, at which she reached the 800 m semi-final. Christmas began attending Loughborough University in 2008. She fell down the rankings in subsequent years but made her first impact at senior level in 2010, placing third at the 2010 British Indoor Athletics Championships and setting a lifetime best of 2:02.54 minutes for the 800 m at the London Grand Prix. In her final year of track and field competition, she ran an indoor best of 2:04.39 minutes for fourth at the Birmingham Indoor Grand Prix and had her best national finish with second at the 2011 British Indoor Athletics Championships.

Cycling career

In her first professional season in 2018, Christmas won the first edition of the Tour de Belle Isle en Terre–Kreiz Breizh Elites Dames one-day race. She finished 64th in the women's road race event at the 2018 UCI Road World Championships.

In December 2020, Christmas signed a contract with the  team, for the 2021 season. Christmas retired from competition at the end of the 2021 season.

Broadcasting career
After retirement, Christmas turned to broadcasting, becoming a regular commentator on GCN and Eurosport.

International competitions

Athletics

Cycling

References

External links
 

1987 births
Living people
British female cyclists
British female middle-distance runners
Place of birth missing (living people)
Alumni of Loughborough University
21st-century British women